Tehreek-e-Soutul Awliya (T.S.A.) is an Islamic Barelvi religious seminary and welfare organisation based in Anantnag district, Jammu and Kashmir, India.

History
Tehreek-e-Soutul Awliya was announced in 2005 by Abdul Rashid Dawoodi during an Islamic conference held in Kehribal village, Anantnag district. The organisation was established shortly afterwards by Yaseen Akhtar Misbahi. It started as a small madrasa. Later, Fayaz Ahmed Rizvi was appointed as its president and Muhammad Yusuf Baba as the general secretary. Over years, it became one of the major religious organisations of Jammu and Kashmir.

In 2022 the organisation has nearly 500 members.

Activities
Every year, TSA organizes its annual conference whose proclaimed aim is to unite the Muslim community.

In September 2022, Jammu and Kashmir government arrested Molana Abdul Rashid Dawoodi along with some other prominent Islamic scholars on unknown grounds.

See also 
 Karwan-I-Islami

References 

2005 establishments in Jammu and Kashmir
Islamic seminaries and theological colleges
Educational institutions established in 2005
Welfare and service organizations
Religious organizations established in 2005
Islamic organisations based in India